Autódromo Internacional de Tarumã is a motorsports circuit located in Viamão, Brazil. It has hosted events in the Formula Renault series and used to host the now defunct Formula 3 Sudamericana. It also hosted the new Brazilian Formula Three Championship.

In 1982, a Formula Two race was held that would be the predecessor of Formula Two Codasur.

Lap records

The official fastest lap records at the Autódromo Internacional de Tarumã are listed as:

References

External links
Map and circuit history at RacingCircuits.info

Tarumã
Sports venues in Rio Grande do Sul